Gibson Lake is a lake in Thunder Bay District and in Charbonneau Township, Algoma District in Northern Ontario, Canada. It is in the Great Lakes Basin, is the source of the Pukaskwa River, and lies entirely within Pukaskwa National Park. There are three unnamed inflows, at the northwest, northeast and southeast. The primary outflow, at the south, is the Pukaskwa River, which flows to Lake Superior.

References

Other map sources:

Lakes of Thunder Bay District
Lakes of Algoma District